The Bournemouth to Birmingham route is a part of the CrossCountry network, linking Bournemouth to Birmingham. The route consists of parts of several lines, and trains running the full length of the route are run by CrossCountry. It is also used in parts by Avanti West Coast, Chiltern Railways, Great Western Railway, South Western Railway and West Midlands Trains . After joining the Cross Country Route at Birmingham, trains proceed to Manchester, Glasgow, Edinburgh or even Aberdeen.

Railway lines in South West England
Railway lines in the West Midlands (region)
Railway lines in South East England
Railway lines in the East Midlands